Tidal irrigation is the subsurface irrigation of levee soils in coastal plains with river water under tidal influence. It is applied in (semi) arid zones at the mouth of a large river estuary or delta where a considerable tidal range (some 2 m) is present. The river discharge must be large enough to guarantee a sufficient flow of fresh water into the sea so that no salt water intrusion occurs in the river mouth. 

The irrigation is effectuated by digging tidal canals from the river shore into the main land that will guide the river water inland at high tide.

For the irrigation to be effective the soil must have a high infiltration capacity to permit the entry of sufficient water in the soil to cover the evapotranspiration demand of the crop.

At low tide, the canals and the soil drain out again, which promotes the aeration of the soil.

See also
Tidal irrigation at Abadan island, Iran

Land management
Irrigation
Hydraulic engineering
Tides